Emmanuel Dyen (born 29 June 1979) is a French sailor. He competed at the 2008 and 2012 Summer Olympics in the 49er class.

References

External links
 
 

1979 births
Living people
French male sailors (sport)
Olympic sailors of France
Sailors at the 2008 Summer Olympics – 49er
Sailors at the 2012 Summer Olympics – 49er